Many environmental film festivals present complete programs of films dedicated to environmental subjects on a regular basis, typically annually. Others are committed to presenting environmental films within their subprograms. The festivals listed below solicit and present films about nature, ecology, conservation, wildlife, pollution, habitat loss, climate change and related topics. Some of the festivals listed here are also members of the Green Film Network. This list is not exhaustive.

References 

Environment